is an action-adventure game developed and published by Nintendo for the Game Boy Advance in 2002. It was developed by Nintendo Research & Development 1, which had developed the previous Metroid game, Super Metroid (1994). Players control the bounty hunter Samus Aran, who investigates a space station infected with shapeshifting parasites known as X.

Like previous Metroid games, Fusion is a side-scrolling game with platform jumping, shooting, and puzzle elements. It introduces mission-based progression that guides the player through certain areas. It was released the day before the GameCube game Metroid Prime in North America; both games can be linked using the GameCube – Game Boy Advance link cable to unlock additional content for Prime.

Fusion was acclaimed for its gameplay, controls, graphics and music, though its shorter length and greater linearity received some criticism. It received several awards, including Handheld Game of the Year at the 2002 Interactive Achievement Awards, Best Game Boy Advance Adventure Game from IGN, and Best Action Game on Game Boy Advance from GameSpot. It was rereleased on the Nintendo 3DS's Virtual Console in 2011 as part of the 3DS Ambassador Program, the Wii U's Virtual Console in 2014, and the Nintendo Switch Online + Expansion Pack in 2023. A sequel, Metroid Dread, was released in 2021 for the Nintendo Switch.

Gameplay

Metroid Fusion is an action-adventure game in which the player controls Samus Aran. Like previous games in the series, Fusion is set in a large open-ended world with elevators that connect regions, which each in turn contains rooms separated by doors. Samus opens most doors by shooting at them, while some only open after she reaches a certain point. Fusion is more linear than other Metroid games due to its focus on storyline; for example, Fusion introduces Navigation Rooms, which tell the player where to go.

The gameplay involves solving puzzles to uncover secrets, platform jumping, shooting enemies, and searching for power-ups that allow Samus to reach new areas. Samus can absorb X Parasites, which restore health, missiles, and bombs. Power-ups are obtained by downloading them in Data Rooms or absorbing a Core-X, which appears after defeating a boss. New features include the ability to grab ledges and climb ladders.

The player can use the GameCube – Game Boy Advance link cable to connect to Fusion and unlock features in Prime: after completing Prime, they can unlock Samus's Fusion Suit, and after completing Fusion, they can unlock an emulated version of the first Metroid game. In Metroid: Zero Mission (2004), players can connect to Fusion using the Game Boy Advance Game Link Cable to unlock a Fusion picture gallery, which includes its ending images.

Plot

Bounty hunter Samus Aran explores the surface of the planet SR388 with a survey crew from Biologic Space Laboratories (BSL). She is attacked by parasitic organisms known as X. On returning to the BSL station, Samus loses consciousness, and her ship crashes. The BSL ship she was escorting recovers her body and transfers it to the Galactic Federation for medical treatment, who discover that the X has infected Samus' central nervous system. They cure her with a vaccine made from cells taken from the infant Metroid that Samus adopted on SR388. The vaccine gives her the ability to absorb the X nuclei for nourishment, but burdens her with the Metroids' vulnerability to cold. Samus's infected Power Suit is sent to the BSL station for examination, although parts of the suit were too integrated with her body to remove during surgery.

When Samus recovers consciousness, she discovers an explosion occurred at the BSL station. She is sent to investigate. The mission is overseen by her new gunship's computer, whom Samus nicknames "Adam" after her former commanding officer, Adam Malkovich. Samus learns that the X parasites can replicate their hosts' physical appearances, and that the X have infected the station with the help of the "SA-X," an X parasite mimicking Samus at full power.

Samus avoids the SA-X and explores the space station, defeating larger creatures infected by the X to recover her abilities. She discovers a restricted lab containing Metroids, and the SA-X sets off the labs' auto-destruct sequence while also attacking the released Metroids, who also devour the SA-X. Samus escapes, but the lab is destroyed. The computer berates Samus for ignoring orders and admits that the Federation was secretly using the lab to breed Metroids. It also reveals that the SA-X has asexually reproduced, subsequently cloning itself. The computer advises Samus to leave the station.

On her way to her ship, the computer orders Samus to leave the rest of the investigation to the Federation, which plans to capture SA-X for military purposes. Knowing that the X would only infect the arriving Federation troops and absorb their spacefaring knowledge to conquer the universe, Samus states her intention to destroy the station. Although the computer initially intends to stop Samus, she calls it "Adam," and reveals that Adam died saving her life. The computer suggests that she should alter the station's propulsion to intercept with SR388 and destroy the planet along with all X populations. Samus realizes that the computer is the consciousness of Adam, uploaded after death. En route to initiate the propulsion sequence, Samus confronts an SA-X, defeats it, and sets the BSL station on a collision course with SR388. As Samus prepares to leave, she is attacked by an Omega Metroid. The SA-X appears and attacks it, but is destroyed; Samus absorbs its nucleus and uses her newly restored Ice Beam to destroy the Omega Metroid. Her ship arrives, piloted by creatures Samus rescued from the station's Habitation Deck. They escape before the station crashes into the planet, destroying it.

Development

Nintendo confirmed a Metroid game for the Game Boy Advance on March 23, 2001. Ken Lobb, Nintendo of America's director of game development, confirmed that it would be a new game and not a port of the 1994 Super NES game Super Metroid. Early footage was shown at the 2001 E3 convention under the name Metroid IV. The footage showed Samus in a dark suit, running on walls and ceilings, with simpler, more "Game Boy Color-like" graphics. At E3 2002, Nintendo demonstrated the game again, now under the title Metroid Fusion, with updated graphics. IGN awarded Metroid Fusion Best of Show and Best Action Game.

Metroid Fusion was developed by Nintendo Research & Development 1 (R&D1), the same team that created Super Metroid. Fusion's gameplay, screen layout, and controls mimic those of Super Metroid, with enhancements. Metroid Fusion is the first 2D Metroid game with animated cutscenes; the story is revealed through text and close-ups. It was written and directed by series designer Yoshio Sakamoto, and produced by Takehiro Izushi.

Sakamoto decided to create an original story instead of remaking a Metroid game because he wanted to do "something really unprecedented", and looked forward to the response. Fusion introduces new gameplay mechanics, such as a more direct, almost mission-based structure that supports the player to explore areas. Objectives are also flexible in how they can be completed, acting "more as a guide for what the player should do instead of giving a completely blank map and saying 'Here you go, figure out what to do and how to do it.

According to the lead programmer, Katsuya Yamano, Nintendo R&D1 did not consult previous Metroid games for programming techniques, and instead used their previous game Wario Land 4 as a reference. Samus's suit design was revamped; the canonical explanation is that this was because an X Parasite had attacked Samus and made her lose all her abilities. Missiles were expanded with two "upgrades", much like the various beam upgrades: the Ice Missile which has a similar effect to the Ice Beam, and the Diffusion Missile which greatly increases the blast radius. Other minor abilities were added to Fusion, such as climbing walls and ceilings. The health and missile drops are replaced by X Parasites that are similarly released after defeating enemies.

The music was composed by Minako Hamano and Akira Fujiwara. According to Hamano, Sakamoto wanted her to create music in accordance with Adam's dialogue. Hamano aimed for "serious, ambient music rather than melody" because she did not want the exploration themes to be "annoying". She also rearranged jingles from Super Metroid for Fusion. As Nintendo of America wanted the developers to look for "Hollywood-like" voice actors, Hamano added a voice of an announcer. The developers planned to feature voice acting, but the voices were only used for warning announcements due to ROM cartridge limitations.

Release
Metroid Fusion was released in North America on November 17, 2002. Fusion can be connected to Metroid Prime for the GameCube, a Metroid game that was released on the same day as Fusion. In Europe, Fusion was released on November 22, followed by the Australian release on November 29. It was released in Japan on February 14, 2003, and in China on March 2, 2006.

A two-disc soundtrack album, Metroid Prime & Fusion Original Soundtracks, was published by Scitron on June 18, 2003. The second disc contains tracks from Fusion, along with an additional track arranged by Shinji Hosoe.

Metroid Fusion was released on the Nintendo 3DS Virtual Console in December 2011 as part of the "3DS Ambassadors" program, one of ten Game Boy Advance games for those who purchased their 3DS consoles before a price drop. Metroid Fusion was among the first three Game Boy Advance games to be released on the Wii U Virtual Console in April 2014. It was released on the Nintendo Switch Online + Expansion Pack service in March 2023. A sequel, Metroid Dread, was released in 2021 for the Nintendo Switch, developed by Nintendo and MercurySteam.

Reception

Metroid Fusion received "universal acclaim" according to review aggregator Metacritic. The Japanese magazine Famitsu gave it 34 out of 40. X-Play said it was a "pleasure to play", and praised its "beautiful" graphics and audio. IGN praised it as an "outstanding achievement on the Game Boy Advance". GamesRadar and GamePro felt that Fusion was too short, but "love[d] every minute of it", finding the hidden secrets and new power-ups "sublimely ingenious". GameSpot was disappointed that the game ended so soon, but said that Metroid fans would enjoy it. Nintendo World Report and Eurogamer called it the best 2D Metroid game and the best Game Boy Advance game so far. Game Informer agreed, describing it as "everything you could want from a Game Boy Advance game" from beginning to end, giving it a perfect review score. Play described it as a "magnified, modified, and improved" version of everything great from Metroid and Super Metroid.

GameSpot thought that Metroid Fusion offered Super Metroid's best qualities packaged in a new adventure. Nintendo Power heralded it as a return to the classic Metroid action gameplay. The "perfect" controls were praised by Electronic Gaming Monthly. Fusion did not feel new to GameSpy, which complained that even the final enemy encounter draws heavy inspiration from Super Metroid. GameZone found that the small screen of the Game Boy Advance was a poor environment in which to play Metroid Fusion, but they found it an exciting game.

Metroid Fusion received several accolades. It was named Handheld Game of the Year at the 2002 Interactive Achievement Awards. It was also chosen as Best Game Boy Advance Adventure Game by IGN and Best Action Game on Game Boy Advance by GameSpot, which had named it the handheld's best game of November 2002 earlier in the year. It was a runner-up for GameSpots annual "Best Sound", "Best Graphics", "Best Story" and overall "Game of the Year" awards among Game Boy Advance games. In 2009, Official Nintendo Magazine called Fusion "sleek, slick and perfectly formed", ranking it the 62nd-best Nintendo game.

Sales
Metroid Fusion has sold over 1.6 million units worldwide. In its debut week, Fusion sold more than 100,000 units in North America. It finished the month of November 2002 with 199,723 copies sold in the United States alone, for total revenues of 5,590,768, making it the third best-selling Game Boy Advance game that month, and the tenth best-selling game across all platforms. It sold 940,000 copies by August 2006, with revenues of 27 million. During the period between January 2000 and August 2006, in the United States it was the twenty-first highest-selling game for the Game Boy Advance, Nintendo DS or PlayStation Portable. As of November 2004, Fusion had sold 180,000 units in Japan.

References

Notes

Citations

External links 
 
 

2002 video games
Experimental medical treatments in fiction
Extinction in fiction
Game Boy Advance games
Games with GameCube-GBA connectivity
Video games about impact events
Interactive Achievement Award winners
Fusion
Metroidvania games
Nintendo Research & Development 1 games
Nintendo Switch Online games
Single-player video games
Video games about shapeshifting
Video games developed in Japan
Video games featuring female protagonists
Video games set in outer space
Video games set on fictional planets
Virtual Console games
Virtual Console games for Wii U
Virtual Console games for Nintendo 3DS